Antha is a genus of moths of the family Noctuidae. The genus was described by Staudinger in 1892.

Species
 Antha grata (Butler, 1881)
 Antha rotunda (Hampson, 1895)

References

Acronictinae
Noctuoidea genera